Kirat Choithram Babani AKA Kirat Babani, (3 January 19227 May 2015) was a writer, journalist and progressive activist of Sindhi language and nation. He had written several books and articles, remained editor in newspapers and magazines, won multiple awards from Government and non-governmental organizations. He died on 7 May 2015 in Mumbai, India.

Education
Kirat Babani had got matriculation certificate from Wills School (Now branch of M. H. Khuwaja Branch School) Nawabshah, Bachelor of Arts from D. G College and Bachelor of Laws from Shahani Law College Karachi.

Ideology
Kirat Babani, doyen and one of the few living old guards of Sindhi nation, had made outstanding contributions in the field of literature, journalism and education.
Kirat was a man of many images. He believed that literature had a purpose. The writer need not be committed to creed, but he had a commitment to life and should portray the life as honestly as possible. Apart from his contributions to Sindhi literature, Kirat had rendered yeoman service to the Sindhi community. He had fought pitched battles against those, who wanted to change the script of Sindhi language adopting Devanagari. Also he led 16-year long struggle for recognition of Sindhi language and its inclusion to that effect in the Constitution of India.
Kirat had perhaps the longest innings (18 years) of the August body, called Akhil Bharat Sindhi Boli Ain Sahit Sabha.
Associated with several literary and social organizations, Kirat Babani was disciplinarian and man of principles. He was outspoken, yet humble, soft, gentle and accommodating.

Struggles
Kirat Babani had visited Russia in 1981 at the invitation of Government. of Soviet Union and Czechoslovakia in 1983, which was sponsored by World Peace Council. He had also visited United States at the invitation of International Sindhi Conference.
Kirat was a Freedom fighter and was imprisoned for 11 months in 1942.
He was President of Akhil Bharat Sindhi Ain Sahit Sabha for record 18 years.
He was a member, Advisory Board of Sindhi Language, Sahitya Akademi, Ministry of HRD, Govt. of India.
He had a short stint in Labour & Students Union movement.

Publications
Kirat Babani had written 15 books, translated 2 novels and History of Marathi Literature. The most significant amongst them are:
1.       Hooa (She) Short Stories, 1956.
2.       Sooree a saa kayo (Call of Gallows), Collection of 8 one Act Plays, 1972.
3.       Jeki Ditho Ho Moon (Whatever I had seen), Travelogue, 1981.
4.       Abol Rani (Queen who would not speak), Sindhi Folk Tales, 1982
5.       Awheen Sab Nanga Ahiyo (All of you are nude), Short Stories, 1987
6.       Kujh Budhayum Kujh Likayum (Narrated some, hidden some), Autobiography in 4 parts, 1993.
7.       Likhyo Liyaka Paeen (Peeing Secretly), Poetry, 2000.
8.       Translation: Significant amongst three is History of Marathi Literature by Kusumawati Despande and M.V Rajadhyaksha.

Journalism
Editor Sindh Rises in English & Sindh Sujag in Sindhi, monthly political magazine since 1991.
In addition, Kirat had also compiled & edited Choond Sindhi Mazmoon (Selected essays), Choond Sindhi Lok Kahanyoon (Selected Sindhi Folk Tales), 1991, which were published by Sahitya Akademi, Ministry of HRD, Government of India.

Awards
Kirat had received number of Awards/ Honours. Given here under are a few most significant ones:
1.       Soviet Land Nehru Peace Award, 1980 (At Moscow, USSR).
2.       Award for Okha Dokha (Literary Analysis), 1982 (At New Delhi by Ministry of Education, Govt. of India).
3.       Award for Outstanding Literary Contribution, 1986 (At Mumbai by Akhil Bharat Sindhi Boli Ain Sahit Sabha)
4.       Award for Significant Literary Contributions, 1987 (At Mumbai by Maharashtra State Sindhi Sahitya Akademi)
5.       Award for Best Literary Work, 1992 (At Calcutta by Bhartiya Bhashal Parishad).

Death
He died on 7 May 2015 in Mumbai, India.

References

Sindhi-language writers
1922 births
2015 deaths
20th-century Indian journalists
People from Shaheed Benazir Abad District
Writers from Mumbai
Journalists from Maharashtra
Indian independence activists from Pakistan
Recipients of the Sahitya Akademi Award in Sindhi
Deaths in India
20th-century Indian novelists
Indian male novelists
20th-century Indian short story writers
Sindhi-language poets
Indian autobiographers
Indian male dramatists and playwrights
D. J. Sindh Government Science College alumni
 Sindhi people